German invasion may refer to:

Pre-1900s 

 German invasion of Hungary (1063)

World War I 

 German invasion of Belgium (1914)
 German invasion of Luxembourg (1914)

World War II 

 Invasion of Poland
 German invasion of Belgium (1940)
 German invasion of Luxembourg
 German invasion of France (1940)
 German invasion of the Netherlands
 Operation Weserübung, Nazi Germany's invasion of Denmark and Norway
 German invasion of Denmark (1940)
 German invasion of Greece
 Battle of Crete, the invasion of Crete by German and Italian forces
 Invasion of Yugoslavia
 Operation Barbarossa, Nazi Germany's invasion of the Soviet Union